Jérôme Lagarrigue (born August 18, 1973) is a French painter living in New York city.

Biography

Lagarrigue was born in Paris, to a French father who was an illustrator and painter, and an American mother who was a journalist and writer. As a child, he was schooled in France, but spent summers in New York City, where he now lives. He graduated from the Rhode Island School of Design, with a major in illustration, in 1996.

Two years after graduation, Parsons School of Design made Lagarrigue professor of drawing and painting.

Solo exhibitions

2001 - "Boxers", The Cutting Room Gallery, 19 W 24th St, New York City.
2002 - "Recent works", Museum of Tolerance, Los Angeles.
2003 - "Paintings", UFA Gallery, 526 W 26th St, New York City.
2005 - "Synchresis", TheXpo Gallery, 63 Pearl St, Brooklyn, New York City.
2006 - "Paesaggio Del viso", Villa Medicis, Rome, Italy and Oliver Waltman Gallery, Paris.
2007 - "Boxing", Galerie Olivier Waltman, 74 Rue Mazarine, Paris.
2009 - "Brooklintimate", Galerie Olivier Waltman, 74 Rue Mazarine, Paris.
2010 - "Urban Boxing United", Palais de la Bourse, Marseilles, France.
2011 - "Anne Claire", BDG Gallery, 535 W 25th St, New York City.
2012 - "Closer", Waltman Ortega Gallery, 2233 NW 2nd Avenue, Miami, FL.
2014 - "Visible Man", Driscoll Babcock Gallery, 525 W 25th Street, New York City.
2017 - "The Tipping Point", Lazarides Gallery, 11 Rathbone Place, London, UK.

Books illustrated

1999 - "My Man Blue", text by Nikki Grimes. 
2002 - "Freedom Summer", text by Deborah Wiles. 
2003 - "Me and Uncle Romie", text by Claire Hartfield. 
2004 - "Going North", text by Janice N. Harrington. 
2004 - "Freedom on the Menu", text by Carole Weatherford. 
2007 - "Poetry for young people", poems by Maya Angelou. 
2007 - "Pleine Face", text by Sylvain Coher, publisher: Éponyme.

References

External links

 
 

1973 births
American children's book illustrators
Rhode Island School of Design alumni
Parsons School of Design faculty
20th-century French painters
20th-century French male artists
French male painters
21st-century French painters
21st-century French male artists
Living people